A Zahn infarct is a pseudo-infarction of the liver, consisting of an area of congestion with parenchymal atrophy but no necrosis, and usually due to obstruction of a branch of the portal vein. Zahn infarcts are unique in that there is collateral congestion of liver sinusoids that do not include areas of anoxia seen in most infarcts.  Fibrotic tissue may develop in the area of the infarct and it could be caused by an occlusive phlebitis in portal vein radicles. Non ischemic infarct of liver with lines of Zahn.


Eponym
The Zahn infarct is named for Friedrich Wilhelm Zahn.

References

 

Diseases of liver
Gross pathology